Tatogga is an unincorporated community  in northwestern British Columbia, Canada. It is located situated along the Stewart-Cassiar Highway (Highway 37) on Tatogga Lake just south of Iskut. Tatogga means "small lake between two big lakes" in the Tahltan language.

References

Unincorporated settlements in British Columbia
Populated places in the Regional District of Kitimat–Stikine
Tahltan
Stikine Country